Bearhead Mountain may refer to:

 Bearhead Mountain (Montana), located in Glacier National Park (U.S.)
 Bearhead Mountain (Washington), located in the Cascade Range